Magnetic Hill Concert Site is a live music venue in Moncton, New Brunswick, Canada. It is one of the largest music venues in Canada.

Originally built in 1984 for Pope John Paul II to hold a papal mass during his tour of Canada, the site was redesigned in the 1990s as a concert venue. The site has hosted annual or biennial summer concerts since the mid-2000s. Additional permanent infrastructure was installed following the 2005 concert headlined by The Rolling Stones. In 2011 a concert headlined by U2 saw the first use of the marketing term Magnetic Hill Music Festival.

See also
List of events in Greater Moncton
Magnetic Hill
Strawberry Fields, a proposed rock festival to be held in Greater Moncton in 1970

References

1984 establishments in New Brunswick
Music venues in New Brunswick
Tourist attractions in Moncton
Buildings and structures in Moncton
Event venues established in 1984